The R349 is a Regional Route in South Africa that runs from the N2 north-east of East London in the west to the coastal towns of Kei Mouth and Morgan's Bay. The route continues on the other side of the Kei Mouth Ferry past the R409 at Centani, past the R408 at Willowvale, past the R411 at Coffee Bay, ending at the R61 14 km west of Port St Johns.

External links
 Routes Travel Info

References

Regional Routes in the Eastern Cape